Adamovas Lake Nature Park is a specially protected nature territory Rēzekne district Vērēmi Parish. The protected area was established in 1977 as a complex nature reserve in the area of  "Lake Adamova with the surrounding landscape",  was reorganized in 1998 into a nature reserve. Natura 2000 site. A popular place to relax.

Flora 
Protected habitats of European importance include natural eutrophic lakes with submerged aquatic and floating vegetation, European black alder (Alnus glutinosa), boreal forests, mixed broadleaf forests.

Three rare species has been discovered in lake Adamovas since the end of the 19th century. In 20th century the eight-stamen waterwort (Elatine hydropiper) has disappeared from the lake due to  water level lowering  and pollution.
Two other rare species – least water-lily (Nuphar pumila) and common rivergrass (Scolochloa festucacea) are thriving well almost everywhere on the lake.

Fauna 
Lake Adamovas and its surroundings are feeding ground for a number of bats species, including the European pond bat (Myotis dasycneme).

References

External links

Nature parks in Latvia
Natura 2000 in Latvia